The Web Gallery of Art (WGA) is a virtual art gallery website. It displays historic European visual art, mainly from the Baroque, Gothic and Renaissance periods, available for educational and personal use.

Overview
The website contains reproductions of over 48,600 works and includes accompanying text on the artworks and artists, accessible through a searchable database. The site is a leading example of an independently established collection of high-quality historically important pictures.

The viewer can select the size of the image; associated music is also included to accompany viewing, and posters of displayed artworks are available. The facility was created by Emil Kren and Daniel Marx.

Copyrights
Most of the images in the gallery are of works that are out of copyright, as they were all produced before 1900 and all named artists in the collection were born well before 1900.  However, copyright for the reproductions displayed on the website may apply within some legal systems.  The WGA itself gives the following copyright statement:
The Web Gallery of Art is copyrighted as a database. Images and documents downloaded from this database can only be used for educational and personal purposes. Distribution of the images in any form is prohibited without the authorization of their legal owner.
Very little information is given on the pages presenting the images, as to who the legal owner of each might be.  In the United States, photo reproductions of public domain two-dimensional art are also in the public domain, as affirmed by the decision in the case of Bridgeman Art Library v. Corel Corp., but this is not the case for photo reproductions of three-dimensional art such as sculptures. Copyrights of the sculpture images therefore remain unclear. Copyrights of the text on the website are also unclear; most of the reproductions in the gallery are displayed as catalog items unaccompanied by any explanatory text, but short explanatory notes for artist biographies or important artworks do exist and are unreferenced.

Database

Their database with over 48,600 artworks created by over 4,000 artists is free to download and they have published statistics over their virtual collection that are on their statistics webpage. Artworks installed in churches and from private collections are represented as well as museums. What follows is a list of institutions with more than 50 works represented on their website, based on their downloadable database.

See also
 List of artists in the Web Gallery of Art (A–K)
 List of artists in the Web Gallery of Art (L–Z)
 List of sculptors in the Web Gallery of Art
 List of graphic artists in the Web Gallery of Art
 The Artchive
 WebMuseum

References

External links

 

 
Virtual art museums and galleries
Tertiary educational websites
Open-access archives
Websites about digital media
Internet properties established in 1996
1996 establishments in Hungary